Patricia Marjory Duncker (born 29 June 1951) is a British novelist and academic.

Academic career
Born in Kingston, Jamaica, the daughter of Noel Aston Duncker (1904–1973), an accountant, and Sheila Joan (née Beer) (1918–2016), a teacher, Her aunt was the poet Patricia Beer, after whom she was named. Duncker attended Bedales School in England and, after a period spent working in Germany, read English at Newnham College, Cambridge. She earned a doctorate from St Hugh's College, Oxford.

She has taught at the University of Wales, Aberystwyth (1991-2002) and was Professor of Prose Fiction at the University of East Anglia, working with the novelists Andrew Cowan and her fellow Professor Michele Roberts. In January 2007, she was appointed Professor of Contemporary Literature at the University of Manchester, where she teaches in the Department of English and American Studies..

Duncker has been married four times, including to: Pedro P. D'a Guedes in 1972; David Norbrook in 1981, and to Peter A. Lambert in 1998;

Bibliography

Fiction

Hallucinating Foucault (novel, 1996) (McKitterick Prize, 1997)
James Miranda Barry (novel, 1999), published in the United States as "The Doctor"
The Deadly Space Between (novel, 2002)
Miss Webster and Chérif (novel, 2006)
The Strange Case of the Composer and His Judge  (novel, 2009)
Sophie and the Sibyl : a Victorian romance  (novel, 2015)

Short stories:
Monsieur Shoushana's Lemon Trees (short stories, 1997)
Seven Tales of Sex and Death (short stories, 2003)

Non-fiction / academic (selection)

Writing on the Wall: Selected Essays (2002) 
"The Suggestive Spectacle: Queer Passions in Brontë's Villette and The Prime of Miss Jean Brodie", Theorising Muriel Spark: Gender, Race Deconstruction, Psychoanalysis, ed. Martin McQuillan (2002) 67–77.
 
"Katherine Mansfield: The Writer of the Submerged World", Interrupted Lives in Literature, ed. Andrew Motion (2004), 53–65.
Introduction to the new Penguin edition and new translation by Helen Constantine of Théophile Gautier's Mademoiselle de Maupin (2005)
  (Patricia Duncker on George Eliot)

References

External links
Official website
Duncker's page at the University of Manchester web site
Profile at www.contemporarywriters.com
Bloomsbury author information
British Council web site

1951 births
Living people
20th-century British novelists
21st-century British novelists
People educated at Bedales School
Alumni of Newnham College, Cambridge
Alumni of St Hugh's College, Oxford
Academics of Aberystwyth University
Academics of the University of East Anglia
Academics of the University of Manchester